The 2013–14 Deutsche Eishockey Liga season was the 20th season since the founding of the Deutsche Eishockey Liga.

Teams

Regular season

GP = Games Played, W = Wins, OTW = Overtime win, SOW = Shootout win, OTL = Overtime loss, SOL = Shootout loss, L = Loss
Color code:  = Direct Playoff qualification,  = Playoff qualification round,  = No playoff qualification

Playoffs

Playoff qualification
The playoff qualification was played between 9–14 March 2014 in a best-of-three mode.

EHC München vs. Iserlohn Roosters

Eisbären Berlin vs. ERC Ingolstadt

Bracket
There was a reseeding after the first round.

Quarterfinals
The quarterfinals were played between 16–28 March 2014 in a Best-of-seven mode.

Hamburg Freezers vs. Iserlohn Roosters

Hamburg won the series 4–2.

Thomas Sabo Ice Tigers vs. EHC Wolfsburg

Wolfsburg won the series 4–2.

Adler Mannheim vs. Kölner Haie

Köln won the series 4–1.

Krefeld Pinguine vs. ERC Ingolstadt

Ingolstadt won the series 4–1.

Semifinals
The semifinals were played between 2–13 April 2014 in a Best-of-seven mode.

Hamburg Freezers vs. ERC Ingolstadt

Ingolstadt won the series 4–2.

Kölner Haie vs. EHC Wolfsburg

Köln won the series 4–1.

Final
The final was played between 17–29 April 2014 in a Best-of-seven mode.

Kölner Haie vs. ERC Ingolstadt

Ingolstadt won the series 4–3.

References

External links
Official website

1
Ger
2013–14